The Red Marl Group is a late Silurian to early Devonian lithostratigraphic group (a sequence of rock strata) in south Wales and Gloucestershire. The Group which was first established in the early twentieth century, includes the modern-day Temeside Mudstone, Raglan Mudstone and St Maughans formations and forms the lower part of the Old Red Sandstone. The rocks of this group have also previously been known as the Red Marl.

References

Silurian System of Europe
Devonian System of Europe
Geology of Wales
Geological groups of the United Kingdom